El pecado de Oyuki refers to:

 El pecado de Oyuki (comics), a Mexican comic book series
 El pecado de Oyuki (TV series), a telenovela based on the comics